Wenshan is a city in and the seat of Wenshan Zhuang and Miao Autonomous Prefecture, in the southeast of Yunnan province, People's Republic of China. It once was a county (Wenshan County), but on 2 December 2010, with the approval of the PRC State Council, it was upgraded to a county-level city.

Administrative divisions
In the present, Wenshan City has 3 subdistricts, 7 towns, 2 townships and 5 ethnic townships. 
3 subdistricts
 Kaihua
 Wolong
 Xinping
7 towns

2 townships
 Xinjie
 Xigu
5 ethnic townships

Former Longxi Township, Xiacun Township

Economy
One of the largest companies based in Wenshan County is the electric power supplier Yunnan Wenshan Electric Power Co., Ltd. It is listed on the Shanghai Stock Exchange. 

The Wenshan Zinc Mine is known for producing world class, deep blue hemimorphite specimens.

Wenshan is a producer of 'Sanchi', a plant with medicinal properties which grows away from daylight under huge plastic sheets.

Climate
Due to its low latitude tempered by its high elevation, Wenshan has a mild humid subtropical climate (Köppen Cwa) with short, mild, dry winters and warm, rainy summers. Wenshan is situated in the so-called 'Valley of Eternal Spring'. Because it is on a plateau, temperatures are quite constant throughout the year, with more precipitations during the summer months.

Transport
Wenshan Puzhehei Airport

References

External links
Wenshan County Official Website

County-level divisions of Wenshan Prefecture
Cities in Yunnan